Wairau was a parliamentary electorate in the Marlborough Region of New Zealand. It was one of the initial 24 New Zealand electorates and existed from 1853 until its abolition in 1938, when it was succeeded by the  electorate. The electorate had 13 representatives during its existence. The 1861 election in the Wairau electorate was notable in that a later Premier, Frederick Weld, was unexpectedly and narrowly defeated by William Henry Eyes.

Population centres
The New Zealand Constitution Act 1852, passed by the British government, allowed New Zealand to establish a representative government. The initial 24 New Zealand electorates were defined by Governor George Grey in March 1853. Wairau was one of the initial single-member electorates.

The initial area covered the Marlborough Sounds in the north to the Hurunui River in the south. Settlements within that area were Picton, Blenheim, and Kaikoura.

The Constitution Act also allowed the House of Representatives to establish new electorates, and this was first done in 1858, when four new electorates were formed by splitting existing electorates. The  electorate was formed by taking area from the Wairau and  electorates.

The Wairau electorate's boundaries were constantly adjusted over the years, but the electorate always covered a large, rural area around the Awatere River, with a long coastal boundary south of Cape Campbell, at times as far south as Kaikoura. Blenheim was always included in the electorate, but Picton not always. Wairau gained large areas of land south of Richmond. It also covered the Marlborough Sounds, and Blenheim was the southernmost point along the coast. The 1922 electoral redistribution reversed this and Wairau moved back to its traditional area.

History
Wairau was one of the original electorates for the first general election in 1853. Frederick Weld was declared elected unopposed at the nomination meeting on 2 August 1853. Weld resigned in June 1855 to return to England, but as the next election was to be held within a few months, this did not cause a by-election. The mail did not reach the Wairau Valley in time, and the electors did not know about the election. The new date for the nomination meeting was set as 6 December. Wells was one of many members of the House of Representatives who resigned in early 1858; he placed a public notice to that effect in the 20 March edition of The Nelson Examiner. At the opening of the second session of the 2nd Parliament on 10 April 1858, the speaker read out 14 resignations, including that of Wells. Weld had returned from England by then and agreed to be a candidate at the by-election, and Alfred Saunders received an acquisition and also agreed to stand. On nomination day, only Weld's name was put forward, who was thus declared elected unopposed.

The New Zealand Constitution Act 1852 gave Parliament the power to establish new electorates, and this was first used later in 1858 when four new electorates were created. This also affected the Wairau electorate, which was combined with the Christchurch Country electorate and then redivided, and the  electorate was established through this process. The 1859 supplementary election returned Edward Jollie for the Cheviot electorate.

In the 1861 election, Weld was challenged by William Henry Eyes, with Eyes winning by a four-vote margin (65 votes to 61). Weld stood two weeks later in the Cheviot electorate, where he decisively beat Charles Hunter Brown. In , Eyes was challenged by Henry Redwood but remained the preferred representative by the voters. In December 1871, Eyes was appointed Crown Lands Commissioner for the Marlborough Province and as a public servant, he could no longer hold a seat in parliament and had to resign. The resulting 1872 by-election was contested by Arthur Seymour and Joseph Ward, with Seymour the successful candidate. Seymour remained a member of the General Assembly until his resignation in 1875 prior to a trip to England. The resulting  was won by Ward, who defeated William Sefton Moorhouse. Seymour returned from England just prior to the 1876 election. George Henderson, a former Mayor of Blenheim, became a candidate in the Wairau electorate whilst Ward announced that he would stand in the  electorate instead. Seymour won the election in the Wairau electorate with 201 votes to 179 for Henderson. Ward was beaten in the Cheviot electorate by Leonard Harper.

In , Dodson defeated Joseph Ward. The  saw a three-way contest, with Dodson challenged by George Henderson and Sutherland John Macalister. Dodson won the election; this was Henderson's third attempt to become the Wairau electorate's representative. Dodson retired in 1890, and three candidates put their name forward: Lindsay Buick, Arthur Seymour, and Sutherland John Macalister. Buick, a journalist and historian, won the election. Buick won the election with an increased majority.

Buick and Mills received 2014 and 2072 votes, respectively, and Mills thus succeeded Buick in Wairau. The 1896 election was "one of the hardest fought contests" in the Wairau electorate up to that point.

Members of Parliament
Key

Election results

1935 election

1931 election

1928 election

1914 election

1899 election

1896 election

1893 election

1890 election

1887 election

1884 election

1881 election

1879 election

1876 election

1875 by-election

1872 by-election

1871 election

1861 election

Notes

References

Historical electorates of New Zealand
Politics of the Marlborough Region
1853 establishments in New Zealand
1938 disestablishments in New Zealand